Jonathan Sterling (born April 16, 1982) is a professional basketball referee in the National Basketball Association (NBA), wearing number 17. Sterling also played college basketball at Flagler College where he earned his Bachelor of Arts degree in Business Management. Sterling previously refereed six NBA Development League seasons, three WNBA seasons and eight NCAA seasons before becoming a full-time referee for the 2017–18 NBA season. Sterling was raised in Satellite Beach, Florida. In June 2017, Sterling married NBA referee Lauren Holtkamp. On October 18, 2017, Sterling made his NBA official debut referring a regular season contest between Denver Nuggets and Utah Jazz at Vivint Arena.

References

External links
National Basketball Referees Association bio

1982 births
Living people
Basketball players from Florida
National Basketball Association referees
NBA G League referees